Rajeev Kumar Singh is a Member of Legislative Assembly (MLA) representing Tarapur constituency in the Bihar Legislative Assembly in India.  He is a member of Janata Dal (United). He has been elected as the MLA on 2 November 2021. Singh got the ticket from Janata Dal (United) amidst the confusion over allocation of Tarapur constituency to Rohit Chaudhary, the younger brother of leader of opposition in Bihar Legislative Council, Samrat Chaudhary. The Tarapur constituency was the stronghold of Shakuni Choudhury, who had influence over Kushwaha voters, who are dominant in this assembly constituency. However, Rajiv Kumar Singh, himself a Kushwaha, was able to defeat his nearest rival in the bypolls of 2021.

Political career
Janata Dal (United) made Rajiv Kumar Singh its candidate in the 2005 assembly elections held in February and October. But in both the elections, Rajeev Kumar Singh had to face defeat from Rashtriya Janata Dal strongman, Shakuni Chowdhary. Prior to this, in the year 2000, Rajeev Kumar Singh had also contested on the ticket of Samata Party but he had to face defeat in that election too.

In
2020 Assembly polls, in Tarapur, a constituency which has Kushwaha caste as majority population, Rashtriya Janata Dal, the party which contested against the Janata Dal United, made Divya Prakash (son of Jai Prakash Narayan Yadav) as their candidate. However, latter was defeated. In the bypolls that was conducted in 2021, RJD made Arun Sah as their candidate against Singh. Sah came from Bania (caste). Singh however became victorious in the by elections by a safe margin.

Electoral performance

References

Janata Dal (United) politicians
Living people
Bihar MLAs 2020–2025

Year of birth missing (living people)